Thomas Dunne may refer to:

 Thomas Dunne (Irish politician) (1926–1990), Irish Fine Gael politician and Member of the European Parliament
 Thomas Dunne (Lord Lieutenant) (born 1933), Lord Lieutenant of Herefordshire in the United Kingdom
 Tommy Dunne (born 1974), Irish hurler
 Thomas Griffin Dunne (born 1955), known as Griffin Dunne, American actor and film director
 Tom Dunne, Irish radio disc jockey
 Tom Dunne (hurler) (1863–?), Irish hurler
 Tom Dunne (footballer) (1906–1983), Australian rules footballer
 Tommy Dunne (footballer, born 1927) (1927–1988), former Irish footballer
 Tommy Dunne (footballer, born 1932) (1932–2015), former Irish international footballer
 Tommy Dunne (footballer, born 1946) (1946–2001), Scottish former footballer
 Tommy Dunne (footballer, born 1972), former footballer and manager
 Thomas L. Dunne (born 1946), American publisher
 Thomas Dunne (geologist) (born 1943), American geologist
 Tommy Dunne (Gaelic footballer), former Laois Gaelic footballer

See also 
 Thomas Dunne Books, British book publisher and division of St Martin's Press
 Thomas Dunn (disambiguation)